What a Treat (foaled 1962 in Kentucky) was an American Thoroughbred racehorse who was voted the 1965 American Champion Three-Year-Old Filly and who was sold as a broodmare in 1972 at a world record price.

Background
Bred and raced by George D. Widener, Jr., she was conditioned for racing by future U.S. Racing Hall of Fame trainer Syl Veitch.

Racing career
As a three-year-old in 1965, What a Treat won seven of the top races for her age group, including a win over older stars Tosmah and Affectionately in capturing the Beldame Stakes.

At age four, carrying high weight, What a Treat finished off the board in the February 15, 1966 Columbiana Handicap at Florida's Hialeah Park Race Track. On that same track, she then won the March 2 Black Helen Handicap and won again at  Aqueduct Racetrack on April 14 before running second in the Bed O' Roses Handicap. The rest of her 1966 campaign brought What a Treat limited success, with her finishing off the board in important races such as the Diana Handicap, Ladies Handicap, and Maskette Handicap. Although What a Treat was in training in May 1967, her career ended that year without further racing success.

Breeding record
What a Treat was retired to broodmare duty at owner George Widener's Old Kenney Farm near Lexington, Kentucky, where he bred her to Never Bend. Following Widener's death in December 1971, on February 12, 1972 What a Treat was auctioned through the Keeneland Sales to a breeding syndicate from France for a then world record price for a broodmare of  US$450,000. Of the foals she birthed for her new owners, her mating to Northern Dancer was the most successful, producing the 1974 colt Be My Guest. Although Be My Guest proved to be a good miler who won three Conditions races in England and Ireland, he is best remembered as one of the foundation sires responsible for turning Ireland's Coolmore Stud into one of the most important Thoroughbred breeding operations in the world.

Pedigree

References

 What a Treat's pedigree and partial racing stats

1962 racehorse births
Racehorses bred in Kentucky
Racehorses trained in the United States
American Champion racehorses
Thoroughbred family 8-c